Third Front in Indian politics refers to various alliances formed by smaller parties at various points in time since 1989 to offer a third option to Indian voters, challenging the Indian National Congress (INC) and Bharatiya Janata Party (BJP).

National Front (1989–1991)
National Front (NF) was a coalition of political parties led by the Janata Dal which formed India's government between 1989 and 1990. N. T. Rama Rao was the president of the national front and V. P. Singh was its convener. The coalition's prime minister was V. P. Singh, later succeeded by Chandra Shekhar. Nationally, the party was represented by Janata Dal and Indian Congress (Socialist). It was represented regionally by Telugu Desam Party in Andhra Pradesh, Dravida Munnetra Kazhagam in Tamil Nadu, and Asom Gana Parishad in Assam. They were supported by the non-member party Left Front. The Leader of the Opposition, P. Upendra was a General Secretary of the Front at its formation.

In 1991, Jharkhand Mukti Morcha became a part of the Front. TDP split in 1995, with a minority faction siding with N. T. Rama Rao and the majority faction choosing to side with Chandrababu Naidu. The Front collapsed before the Lok Sabha elections of 1996, when NF tried to include in both DMK and AIADMK, resulting in the DMK walking out. After N. T. Rama Rao died of a heart attack in January 1996, Janata Dal stood by Rama Rao's widow Lakshmi Parvathi while Left parties formed an alliance with Chandrababu Naidu.

United Front (1996–1998)
 
After the 1996 elections, Janata Dal, Samajwadi Party, Dravida Munnetra Kazhagam, Telugu Desam Party, Asom Gana Parishad, All India Indira Congress (Tiwari), Left Front (4 parties), Tamil Maanila Congress, National Conference, and Maharashtrawadi Gomantak Party formed a 13 party United Front (UF). The coalition formed two governments in India between 1996 and 1998. The Prime Minister was first from Janata Dal - H. D. Deve Gowda, then later succeeded by I. K. Gujral, after Jyoti Basu, V. P. Singh declined to become the Prime Minister. Both governments were supported from outside by the Indian National Congress under Sitaram Kesri. N. Chandrababu Naidu of the Telugu Desam Party served as the convener of United Front.

The Indian general election in 1996 returned a fractured verdict. With the Bharatiya Janata Party (BJP) emerging as the largest party, with 161 of 543 seats, it was invited first to form a government. It accepted the offer, and Atal Bihari Vajpayee was sworn in as prime minister. However, he was unable to muster a majority on the floor of the house, and the government fell 13 days later. At a meeting of all the other parties, the Indian National Congress, with a substantial 140 seats, declined to head the government and along with the Communist Party of India (Marxist), agreed to extend outside support to a coalition with the Janata Dal at its head, named the "United Front". Other members of the front included the Samajwadi Party, Dravida Munnetra Kazhagam, Asom Gana Parishad, Tamil Maanila Congress, Communist Party of India and Telugu Desam Party.

With the approval of the Congress and CPI(M), the sitting Chief Minister of Karnataka, H. D. Deve Gowda, was asked to head the coalition as Prime Minister after V. P. Singh, Jyoti Basu, Lalu Prasad Yadav, Mulayam Singh Yadav, G. K. Moopanar and M. Karunanidhi declined. His term was from 1 June 1996 – 21 April 1997. The Congress revoked its support to Deva Gowda amidst discontent over communication between the coalition and the Congress. It compromised to support a new government under I. K. Gujral, who was Prime Minister from 21 April 1997 – 19 March 1998. Following the collapse of his government, fresh elections were called, and the United Front lost power.

United National Progressive Alliance (2007-2009)            
On June 18, 2007, the opposition leader of Tamil Nadu Legislative Assembly and General Secretary of AIADMK J.Jayalalithaa announced she is forming third front called 
United National Progressive Alliance. She was that alliance's convener and Chandrababu Naidu served as leader. Other Parties like, MDMK, Assam Kana Parishad, Kerala Congress, Jharkhand Vikas Morcha were also in this alliance. This Alliance Leaders and Amar Singh, and S. Bangarappa participated at the election rally of the Samajwadi Party at K.P.Inter College in Allahabad on April 23, 2007. This Alliance Supported for president Abdul Kalam contest in 2007 Indian presidential election, but Abdul Kalam did not contest in that election. So, That alliance's leader J. Jayalalithaa said, "Our Alliance Not Participate in this Election," but on election day his party AIADMK and his alliance party MDMK voted in the presidential election.  She Said, "AIADMK MLAs have deliberated on their own, decided on their own and cast their votes due to the erroneous explanation given by the Election Commission regarding voting in the presidential election." This Alliance announced that Rasheed Masood, Member of Samajwadi Party candidate in 2007 Indian vice presidential election, only got 75 Votes and was defeated by Hamid Ansari. Recently, Jayalalithaa attacked the Samajwadi Party on the nuclear deal issue.  He said we don't know whether we are in the 3rd team or not.

To that, Samajwadi Party General Secretary Amar Singh retorted that Jayalalithaa was trying for a BJP alliance. After that Party and AIADMK up stepped from this alliance, but rejoin in Alliance. BSP National President Mayawati joined in this alliance and requested other leaders announced she as  prime minister candidate. Parties Bahujan Samaj Party, Communist Party of India (Marxist), Communist Party of India, Forward Bloc, Revolutionary Socialist, Rashtriya Lok Dal, Secular Janata Dal, Telugu Desam, Telangana Rashtra Samithi, Indian National Lok Dal, Jharkhand Vikas Morcha also joined on this Alliance. Speaking to reporters after voting on May 13, 2009, Jayalalithaa said that a decision will be taken about who to support after the election.  "All options are open," he said.

CPIM leading the Third Front
The CPI(M) led the formation of the Third Front for the 2009 election. This front was basically a collection of regional political parties who were neither in UPA nor in the NDA. Parties like CPIM, CPI, AIFB, RSP, BSP, AIADMK, MDMK, BJD, JD(S), HJC, TDP were the members of this front. The newly formed alliance carried with them 109 seats before the 2009 election. After the election, the alliance won only 79 seats.

Federal Front (2019) 

Federal Front was an alliance of regional parties proposed by K. Chandrashekar Rao. But this proposed alliance was not materialized.

See also
Mahagathbandhan

References

Political terminology in India
Political party alliances in India